George Frederick "Tic" Garbutt (June 18, 1903 – September 21, 1967) was a Canadian ice hockey player who competed in the 1932 Winter Olympics.

In 1932 he was a member of the Winnipeg Hockey Club, the Canadian team that won the gold medal. He played one match and scored one goal.

Garbutt was also a member of the Winnipeg Grads club that represented Canada at the 1931 IIHF world championship tournament in Poland.  Canada, in a thoroughly dominant performance, won the gold medal.  The Canadians went undefeated in their six games and outscored their opponents by an aggregate of 24–0.  (Sweden managed a 0–0 tie versus the Canadians to deprive Canada of a perfect record.)

He is buried in Brookside Cemetery in Winnipeg.

External links
profile

1903 births
1967 deaths
Canadian ice hockey centres
Ice hockey players at the 1932 Winter Olympics
Olympic gold medalists for Canada
Olympic ice hockey players of Canada
Winnipeg Hockey Club players
Olympic medalists in ice hockey
Medalists at the 1932 Winter Olympics